Holarrhena mitis is a small, fragrant-flowered tree in the family Apocynaceae. It is found in Sri Lanka at elevations below . It has smooth, white bark and soft, fine-grained, yellow-white wood.
The wood and bark have been used to treat fevers and dysentery. 
Common names include kiri-mawara or kiri-walla in Sinhala and kuluppalai in Tamil.

References

Trees of Sri Lanka
mitis
Endemic flora of Sri Lanka